The 1915 Philadelphia Phillies season was a season in American baseball. It involved the Phillies winning the National League, then going on to lose the 1915 World Series to the Boston Red Sox. This was the team's first pennant since joining the league in 1883. They would have to wait another 35 years for their second — and another 65 years for their first World Championship.

Offseason 
 February 14, 1915: Sherry Magee was traded by the Phillies to the Boston Braves for Oscar Dugey, Possum Whitted, and cash.

Regular season 

The pitching staff allowed the fewest runs in the NL. It was led by Hall of Famer Grover Cleveland Alexander, who had one of the greatest seasons in history and won the pitching triple crown. Outfielder Gavvy Cravath, aided by the small Baker Bowl park, led the majors in home runs, runs batted in, and slugging percentage.

Season standings

Record vs. opponents

Roster

Player stats

Batting

Starters by position 
Note: Pos = Position; G = Games played; AB = At bats; H = Hits; Avg. = Batting average; HR = Home runs; RBI = Runs batted in

Other batters 
Note: G = Games played; AB = At bats; H = Hits; Avg. = Batting average; HR = Home runs; RBI = Runs batted in

Pitching

Starting pitchers 
Note: G = Games pitched; IP = Innings pitched; W = Wins; L = Losses; ERA = Earned run average; SO = Strikeouts

Other pitchers 
Note: G = Games pitched; IP = Innings pitched; W = Wins; L = Losses; ERA = Earned run average; SO = Strikeouts

Relief pitchers 
Note: G = Games pitched; W = Wins; L = Losses; SV = Saves; ERA = Earned run average; SO = Strikeouts

Awards and honors

League top five finishers 
Grover Cleveland Alexander
 MLB leader in wins (31)
 MLB leader in ERA (1.22)
 MLB leader in strikeouts (241)
 MLB leader in shutouts (12)

Dave Bancroft
 #3 in NL in runs scored (85)

Gavvy Cravath
 MLB leader in home runs (24)
 MLB leader in RBI (115)
 MLB leader in slugging percentage (.510)
 NL leader in runs scored (89)
 NL leader in on-base percentage (.393)

Fred Luderus
 #2 in NL in batting average (.315)
 #2 in NL in slugging percentage (.457)

Erskine Mayer
 #3 in NL in wins (21)

Postseason

1915 World Series

Game 1 
The Phillies won 3 to 1, although The New York Times reporter Hugh Fullerton wrote, "Alexander pitched a bad game of ball. He had little or nothing." He titled his article, "Nothing but luck saved the Phillies." The Times also reported that 10,000 people gathered in New York City's Times Square to watch a real-time mechanical recreation of the game on a giant scoreboard sponsored by the newspaper.

October 8, 1915, at Baker Bowl in Philadelphia

Game 2 
October 9, 1915, at Baker Bowl in Philadelphia

Game 3 
October 11, 1915, at Braves Field in Boston, Massachusetts

Game 4 
October 12, 1915, at Braves Field in Boston, Massachusetts

Game 5 
October 13, 1915, at Baker Bowl in Philadelphia

Legacy
On October 16, 1915, a testimonial dinner was given to honor the 1915 Phillies for the franchise's first pennant.  The dinner took place at The Bellevue-Stratford Hotel. Speakers included Philadelphia mayor Rudolph Blankenburg, Phillies owner William Baker, National League president John Tener, and Phillies manager Pat Moran.

The team marked its 25th anniversary in 1940 when the pennant remained the club's lone to date. Gerry Nugent announced in April 1940 that the organization would welcome back the players from the 1915 team to celebrate the anniversary. Bill Killefer, Bert Neihoff, Milt Stock, and Ben Tincup all remained in organized baseball in 1940 as managers or coaches.

Notes

References 
Baseball Reference: 1915 Philadelphia Phillies season

External links 

Philadelphia Athletics Historical Society: 1915 Phillies

Philadelphia Phillies seasons
Philadelphia Phillies season
National League champion seasons
Philly